Meredith Heron is a designer and television personality who lives and works in Toronto, Ontario, Canada.

Meredith has appeared as a host designer on Home and Garden Television's Love by Design and Design Match, and as a guest on House & Home.  Most recently and notably, Meredith has appeared on many episodes of the Food Network's top rated show:  Restaurant Makeover, which also airs on Fine Living in the United States.

See also
Restaurant Makeover

External links

http://www.meredithheron.com

References
https://web.archive.org/web/20071024185044/http://www.hgtv.ca/ontv/hostdetails.aspx?hostid=40188 
http://www.hgtv.com/hal-eisen-meredith-heron/bio/ 
http://www.intel.com/ca/business/casestudies/pdf/red_heron.pdf 
https://web.archive.org/web/20081121223453/http://www.styleathome.com/Today/askus/favourite-holiday-traditions-n236074p1.html 
https://web.archive.org/web/20110522154404/http://www.eyeweekly.com/eye/issue/issue_03.29.07/food/food.php 
https://web.archive.org/web/20110706192330/http://blogs.senecac.on.ca/senecainthenews/entry/seneca_in_the_news_december

Living people
Year of birth missing (living people)
Canadian women television personalities
Canadian interior designers
Participants in Canadian reality television series